The modern Igbo alphabet (Igbo: Mkpụrụ Edemede Igbo), otherwise known as the  Igbo alphabet (Igbo: Mkpụrụ Edemede Igbo), is the alphabet of the Igbo language, it is one of the three national languages of Nigeria. The modern Igbo alphabet is made up of 36 letters, which includes only a 23-letter set of the ISO basic Latin alphabet minus C, Q, and X, which are not part of Abidịị Igbo. The alphabet uses the dot above on the letter Ṅ, and the dot below on Ị, Ọ and Ụ.

There are numerous Igbo dialects, some of which are not mutually intelligible. The standard written form of Igbo is based on the Owerri and Umuahia dialects.

A New Standard Orthography has been proposed for Igbo, and it was used, for example, in the 1998 Igbo English Dictionary by Michael Echeruo, but it has not been otherwise widely adopted. In this orthography, diaeresis replaces the dot below (ï ö ü), and the ch digraph is not used.

Letters 
The 36-letter alphabet is called Mkpụrụ Edemede or Abidịị, featuring 28 consonants (mgbochiume) and 8 vowels (ụdaume).

See also 
Igbo language
Igbo people
Pan-Nigerian alphabet
Nwagu Aneke script
Africa Alphabet
African reference alphabet

References

External links 
https://www.omniglot.com/writing/igbo.htm
https://ezinaulo.com/igbo-lessons/pronunciation/igbo-alphabet/
https://www.britannica.com/topic/Igbo
Igbo language Orthography and spelling

Igbo language
Latin alphabets
Writing systems of Africa